Now is the third and final studio album by American country music singer Jessica Andrews.  It was released on April 15, 2003. The single "There's More to Me Than You"  served as its lead-off single, reaching Top 20 on the country charts. "Good Time" was also a single, peaking at number 49 on the country charts.

Content
Several of the album's songs, including lead single "There's More to Me Than You", were written by Marcel, who would later become Andrews's husband. Now is also Andrews' last album, although she had multiple single releases afterward. In 2004, she recorded a duet with Bret Michaels of Poison titled "All I Ever Needed". After it, she released two singles for an unreleased fourth album for DreamWorks which would have been titled Ain't That Life, plus one single for Carolwood Records.

The album was produced by Byron Gallimore, the producer of Andrews' previous two albums, except for the track "Second Sunday", which was produced by James Stroud and Billy Mann.

Critical reception

Stephen Thomas Erlewine of AllMusic concluded his review by saying: "But even if this does have an adult-pop bent, it's still done better than nearly any other adult-pop in 2003, and the times that Now does loosen up offer tantalizing possibilities of where Andrews could go next. And, no matter which way you cut it, as of this writing Now is one of the best mainstream pop albums of 2003, with only Kelly Clarkson's Thankful rivaling it in consistency and quality."

Track listing

Personnel
Compiled from liner notes.

Musicians

"There's More to Me Than You"
Jessica Andrews – lead vocals
Bekka Bramlett – tambourine
Lisa Cochran – background vocals
Shannon Forrest – drums
Kenny Greenberg – electric guitar
Aubrey Haynie – fiddle
Michael Landau – electric guitar
Brent Mason – electric guitar
Gene Miller – background vocals
Steve Nathan – Hammond B-3 organ
Paul Franklin – steel guitar
Glenn Worf – bass guitar

"When Gentry Plays Guitar"
Jessica Andrews – lead vocals
Lisa Cochran – background vocals
Stuart Duncan – fiddle
Shannon Forrest – drums
Byron Gallimore – shaker
Michael Landau – electric guitar
Brent Mason – acoustic guitar
Gene Miller – background vocals
Steve Nathan – piano, keyboards
Paul Franklin – steel guitar
Glenn Worf – bass guitar

"I Wish for You"
Jessica Andrews – lead vocals
Mike Brignardello – bass guitar
Pat Buchanan – electric guitar
Lisa Cochran – background vocals
Paul Franklin – steel guitar, slide guitar
Byron Gallimore – synthesizer
Aubrey Haynie – mandolin
B. James Lowry – acoustic guitar
Brent Mason – electric guitar
Gene Miller – background vocals
Steve Nathan – piano, keyboards
Lonnie Wilson – drums, shaker, tambourine

"To Love You Once"
Jessica Andrews – lead vocals
Mike Brignardello – bass guitar
Pat Buchanan – electric guitar
Lisa Cochran – background vocals
Vinnie Colaiuta – drums
Paul Franklin – steel guitar
Aubrey Haynie – fiddle, mandolin
B. James Lowry – acoustic guitar
Frank Macek – programming
Brent Mason – electric guitar
Gene Miller – background vocals
Steve Nathan – keyboards, Hammond B-3 organ
Russ Pahl – banjo

"I Bring It to You"
 Jessica Andrews – lead vocals
 Bekka Bramlett – background vocals
 Pat Buchanan – electric guitar
 Stuart Duncan – fiddle
 Paul Franklin – steel guitar
 Byron Gallimore – synthesizer strings, oboe
 Aubrey Haynie – fiddle
 Michael Landau – electric guitar
 B. James Lowry – acoustic guitar
 Brent Mason – electric guitar
 Gene Miller – background vocals
 Steve Nathan – keyboards
 Lonnie Wilson – drums
 Glenn Worf – bass guitar

"Never Forgotten"
 Jessica Andrews – lead vocals
 Bekka Bramlett – background vocals
 Shannon Forrest – drums
 Paul Franklin – steel guitar
 Byron Gallimore – synthesizer strings, acoustic guitar
 Kenny Greenberg – electric guitar
 Aubrey Haynie – fiddle
 Brent Mason – electric guitar
 Gene Miller – background vocals
 Steve Nathan – keyboards
 Glenn Worf – bass guitar
 Jonathan Yudkin – viola, cello

"They Are the Roses"
 Jessica Andrews – lead vocals
 Mike Brignardello – bass guitar, fretless bass
 Pat Buchanan – electric guitar
 Lisa Cochran – background vocals
 Paul Franklin – steel guitar
 Byron Gallimore – acoustic guitar, synthesizer cello, percussion
 Aubrey Haynie – mandolin
 Michael Landau – electric guitar
 B. James Lowry – acoustic guitar
 Frank Macek – programming
 Brent Mason – electric guitar
 Gene Miller – background vocals
 Steve Nathan – piano, keyboards
 Lonnie Wilson – drums, tambourine
 Jonathan Yudkin – cello

"Sunshine and Love"
 Jessica Andrews – lead vocals
 Pat Buchanan – electric guitar
 Mike Brignardello – bass guitar
 Mark Casstevens – banjo
 Lisa Cochran – background vocals
Paul Franklin – steel guitar
 Aubrey Haynie – mandolin
 Michael Landau – electric guitar
 B. James Lowry – acoustic guitar
 Brent Mason – electric guitar
 Gene Miller – background vocals
 Steve Nathan – Hammond B-3 organ, Wurlitzer
Lonnie Wilson – drums

"You're the Man"
 Jessica Andrews – lead vocals
 Bekka Bramlett – tambourine
 Shannon Forrest – drums
 Byron Gallimore – acoustic guitar, synthesizer strings
 Aubrey Haynie – fiddle
 Michael Landau – electric guitar
 Brent Mason – electric guitar
 Gene Miller – background vocals
 Steve Nathan – piano, keyboards
 Mica Roberts – background vocals
 Glenn Worf – bass guitar
 Jonathan Yudkin – viola, cello

"Cowboy Guarantee"
 Jessica Andrews – lead vocals
 Mike Brignardello – bass guitar
 Lisa Cochran – background vocals
 Vinnie Colaiuta – drums
 Aubrey Haynie – fiddle
 B. James Lowry – acoustic guitar
 Brent Mason – electric guitar
 Gene Miller – background vocals
 Steve Nathan – piano, keyboards
 Russ Pahl – steel guitar

"Now"
 Jessica Andrews – lead vocals
 Mike Brignardello – bass guitar
 Pat Buchanan – electric guitar
 Lisa Cochran – background vocals
 Vinnie Colaiuta – drums
 Frank Macek – programming
 Byron Gallimore – electric guitar, synthesizer strings, percussion
 Aubrey Haynie – fiddle, mandolin
 Michael Landau – electric guitar
 B. James Lowry – acoustic guitar
Brent Mason – electric guitar
 Gene Miller – background vocals
 Steve Nathan – piano, keyboards
 Russ Pahl – steel guitar

"Second Sunday"
 Jessica Andrews – lead vocals, background vocals
 Julian Bunetta – programming
 Shannon Forrest – drums
 Paul Franklin – steel guitar
 Tony Harrell – piano, keyboards
 Aubrey Haynie – fiddle, mandolin
 Billy Mann – acoustic guitar
 Brent Mason – electric guitar
 Mica Roberts – background vocals
 Glenn Worf – bass guitar

"Windows on a Train"
 Jessica Andrews – lead vocals
 Shannon Forrest – drums
 Byron Gallimore – acoustic guitar
 Kenny Greenberg – electric guitar
 Aubrey Haynie – fiddle
 Michael Landau – electric guitar
 Brent Mason – electric guitar
 Steve Nathan – piano, keyboards
 Glenn Worf – bass guitar
 Jonathan Yudkin – viola, cello

"God Don't Give Up on Us"
 Jessica Andrews – lead vocals
 Mike Brignardello – bass guitar
 Byron Gallimore – percussion, horns
 Kenny Greenberg – acoustic guitar, electric guitar
 Steve Nathan – piano, keyboards, synthesizer strings
 Lonnie Wilson – drums

"Good Time"
 Jessica Andrews – lead vocals 
 Bekka Bramlett – background vocals, tambourine
 Shannon Forrest – drums
 Paul Franklin – steel guitar, Dobro
 Byron Gallimore – acoustic guitar
 Aubrey Haynie – fiddle
 Brent Mason – electric guitar
 Gene Miller – background vocals
 Steve Nathan – piano, keyboards, Hammond B-3 organ
 John Willis – banjo
 Glenn Worf – bass guitar

Technical
 Byron Gallimore – production (all tracks except "Second Sunday"); mixing (tracks 1, 2, 5, 6, 7, 9, 11, 13, 14, 15), vocal overdubs (tracks 3, 4, and 8)
 Julian King – recording
 Bob Ludwig – mastering
 Billy Mann – production ("Second Sunday" only)
 Mike Shipley – mixing (tracks 3, 4, 8, 10)
 James Stroud – production ("Second Sunday" only)
 Andy Zulla – mixing (track 12)

Chart performance

Weekly charts

Year-end charts

Singles

References

2003 albums
Jessica Andrews albums
DreamWorks Records albums
Albums produced by Byron Gallimore